Events in 2010 in anime.

Accolades
At the Mainichi Film Awards, Colorful won the Animation Film Award. Arrietty won the Japan Academy Prize for Animation of the Year. Internationally, King of Thorn, Mai Mai Miracle and Oblivion Island: Haruka and the Magic Mirror were nominated for the Asia Pacific Screen Award for Best Animated Feature Film.

Releases

Films
A list of anime that debuted in theaters between January 1 and December 31, 2010.

Television series
A list of anime television series that debuted between January 1 and December 31, 2010.

Original video animations
A list of original video animations that debuted between January 1 and December 31, 2010.

See also
 2010 in animation

References

External links 
Japanese animated works of the year, listed in the IMDb

Years in anime
Anime
Anime